Bush Field may refer to:
 Bush Field (Yale), a baseball stadium
 Augusta Regional Airport, an airport in Georgia, United States